Jorge Orlando Calvo (27 April 1961 – 10 January 2023) was an Argentine geologist and paleontologist working for "Centro de Investigaciones Paleontológicas Lago Barreales" (National University of Comahue).

Life and career
Jorge Orlando Calvo was born in Córdoba, Argentina, on 27 April 1961. He was a professor in Geology and Paleontology at the National University of Comahue, Neuquén. He was one of the founders of the Geology Career (2010) at this university as well as the Director of the Barreales Lake Paleontological Center.

Calvo became a geologist in 1986 and in 1991 he won a Fulbright scholarship to do a Master in Paleontological Sciences (1992) at the University of Illinois at Chicago, USA, getting his degree in 1994. In 2006, he earned his PhD degree at the Federal University of Rio de Janeiro, Brazil.

Calvo devoted his life to the discovering, digging and studying of Vertebrate Paleontology. He was the first palaeontologist to live and work in the Neuquén province. He was both author and co-author of many discoveries of his own about new taxa in dinosaurs, birds, crocodiles, frogs, turtles, eggs and dinosaur tracks. Calvo was the first palaeontologist to have helped develop not only the Paleontological Science in Norpatagonia (1987), but also the Paleontological Tourism. He was the founder of the Geology and Paleontology Museum of the National University of Comahue (1990), the Paleontological Museum of Rincón de los Sauces (2000) and the Barreales Lake Paleontological Center (2002).

As a researcher of the National University of Comahue, he was the Director of more than 15 national and international research projects led from institutions such as Conicet, Agencia Nacional de Ciencia y Tecnologia and Universidad Nacional del Comahue (Argentina), Duke Foundation of United States, Dinosaur Society of America, National Geographic Society, etc.

Calvo was the director of theses for graduates, masters and PhD students. He published more than 88 scientific papers and more than 60 in non-specialist magazines. He also read more than 135 papers and lectures at Congresses of the specialty worldwide.

Calvo was invited to lecture on dinosaurs from Norpatagonia in different cities of Argentina, Brazil, Chile, Italy, Finland, Romania and Serbia. He was also a coordinator in more than 25 events of paleontological shows, exhibitions and Interactive museums.

He both described and co-described many species:
 Andesaurus delgadoi Calvo & Bonaparte, 1991
 Picunichnus benedettoi Calvo, 1991 (a)
 Sauropodichnus giganteus Calvo, 1991 (a)
 Sousaichnium monetae Calvo, 1991 (a)
 Deferrariischnium mapuchensis Calvo, 1991 (a)
 Limayichnus major Calvo, 1991 (a)
 Neuquenornis volans Chiappe & Calvo, 1994
 Limaysaurus tessonei Calvo & Salgado, 1995 (b)
 Megaloolithus patagonicus Calvo, Engelland, Heredia & Salgado, 1997 (c)
 Avitabatrachus uliana Báez, Trueb & Calvo, 2000
 Araripesuchus patagonicus Ortega, Gasparini, Buscalioni & Calvo, 2000
 Anabisetia saldiviai Coria & Calvo, 2002
 Rinconsaurus caudamirus Calvo & González Riga, 2003
 Unenlagia paynemili Calvo, Porfiri & Kellner, 2004
 Ekrixinatosaurus novasi Calvo, Rubillar-Rogers & Moreno, 2004
 Puertasaurus reuili Novas, Salgado, Calvo & Agnolin, 2005
 Pehuenchesuchus enderi Turner & Calvo, 2005
 Futalognkosaurus dukei Calvo, Porfiri, González Riga & Kellner, 2007
 Neuquensuchus universitas Fiorelli & Calvo, 2007
 Muyelensaurus pecheni Calvo, González Riga & Porfiri, 2007
 Macrogryphosaurus gondwanicus Calvo, Porfiri & Novas, 2007
 Linderochelys rinconensis De la Fuente, Calvo & Gonzalez Riga, 2007
 Austroraptor cabazai Novas, Pol, Canale, Porfiri & Calvo, 2009
 Titanopodus mendozensis Gonzalez Riga & Calvo, 2009
 Panamericansaurus schroederi Calvo & Porfiri, 2010
 Willinakaqe salitralensis R. D. Juárez Valieri, J. A. Haro, L. E. Fiorelli & J. O. Calvo, 2010
 Pamparaptor minimus J. D. Porfiri, J. O. Calvo and D. Dos Santos, 2011
 Leufuichthys minimus Gallo, Calvo & Kellner, 2011
 Traukutitan eocaudata Juárez Valieri & Calvo, 2011
 Notocolossus gonzalezparejasi B. J. González Riga, M. C. Lamanna, L. D. Ortiz David, J. O. Calvo & J. P. Coria, 2016

References

(a) Calvo, J.O. 1991. Huellas de dinosaurios en la Formación Río Limay (Albiano-Cenomaniano) Picún Leufú. Provincia del Neuquén . Argentina. (Ornithischia-Saurischia: Saurópoda-Terópoda) Ameghiniana, 28 (3-4): 241–258.

(b) Calvo, J. O. y L. Salgado, 1995. Rebbachisaurus tessonei  sp. nov.  a new sauropod of the Albian-Cenomanian of Argentina; new evidence on the origin of the Diplodocidae. GAIA 11:13-33.

(c) Calvo, J.O.; Engelland, S.; Heredia, S. Salgado, L. 1997. First record of dinosaur eggshells (?Sauropoda-Megaloolithidae) from Neuquén, Patagonia, Argentina. GAIA Portugal.  14:23-32.

External links 
 Publicaciones del Dr. Jorge Orlando Calvo

1961 births
2023 deaths
Argentine paleontologists
National University of Córdoba alumni
Federal University of Rio de Janeiro alumni
University of Illinois alumni
Academic staff of the National University of Comahue
Fulbright alumni
People from Córdoba, Argentina
Zoologists with author abbreviations